Chugach may refer to:

 Chugach people, an Alutiiq people of southcentral Alaska
 Chugach Alaska Corporation, an Alaska Native Regional Corporation
 Chugach Census Area, Alaska, a census area within the unorganized borough in Alaska
 Chugach National Forest, a national forest in southcentral Alaska
 Chugach Mountains, a mountain range in southcentral Alaska
 Chugach State Park, a state park in southcentral Alaska